Adam Krupa (born 18 December 1952) is a Polish retired footballer from Cieszyn, who played as a midfielder.

Career
Adam Krupa began his footballing career in his hometown with Piast Cieszyn. In 1971 he moved to Polonia Bytom, of Poland’s premier league, the Ekstraklasa. Krupa then played briefly for Arka Gdynia, before returning to Polonia Bytom in 1978. In total he made over 200 appearances in the Ekstraklasa, scoring 10 goals. He also played at the international level for Poland’s U23 squad.

In 1981 he moved to the United States and joined the Tulsa Roughnecks of the North American Soccer League. He was a starter in Soccer Bowl '83 on the Roughnecks’ only championship winning team. Krupa also played indoor soccer for Tulsa from 1981–84. After the NASL folded in 1985, he signed with the Chicago Sting of the Major Indoor Soccer League during the 1985–86 season where he appeared in 10 games.

Honors
Tulsa Roughnecks:
Soccer Bowl: 1983

Polonia Bytom:
Polish Cup: 1972–73 (finalist)

References

External links 
 NASL/MISL stats

1952 births
Living people
Arka Gdynia players
Association football midfielders
Chicago Sting (MISL) players 
Ekstraklasa players 
Expatriate soccer players in the United States 
Major Indoor Soccer League (1978–1992) players
North American Soccer League (1968–1984) indoor players
North American Soccer League (1968–1984) players
People from Cieszyn
Polish expatriate footballers
Polish footballers
Polonia Bytom players
Sportspeople from Silesian Voivodeship 
Tulsa Roughnecks (1978–1984) players